Novan Setya Sasongko (born 26 November 1989) is an Indonesian professional footballer who plays as a full-back for Liga 1 club Madura United.

Club career 
He started his career in Persibo Bojonegoro since 2008. He played as a substitute in the 2009–10 Liga Indonesia Premier Division final, where Persibo beat Delta Putra Sidoarjo 3–1 on penalties following a 0–0 draw.

International career 
His international debut was an away friendly match against Philippines on June 5, 2012.

Honours

Club
Persibo Bojonegoro
 Liga Indonesia Premier Division: 2009–10
 Piala Indonesia: 2012

Semen Padang
Indonesian Community Shield: 2013

Sriwijaya
East Kalimantan Governor Cup: 2018

Persebaya Surabaya
 Liga 1 runner-up: 2019
 Indonesia President's Cup runner-up: 2019

References

External links 
 
 

1989 births
Living people
Indonesian footballers
Sportspeople from East Java
People from Bojonegoro Regency
Persibo Bojonegoro players
Semen Padang F.C. players
Sriwijaya F.C. players
Bali United F.C. players
Persebaya Surabaya players
Persela Lamongan players
Madura United F.C. players
Indonesia international footballers
Liga 1 (Indonesia) players
Indonesian Premier League players
Indonesian Premier Division players
Association football fullbacks